Günəşli (formerly known as Kilsəli) is a village in the Kalbajar District of Azerbaijan.

References

External Links

Populated places in Kalbajar District